Pierrot (stylized as PIERROT) was a Japanese visual kei rock band formed in 1994 in Nagano. After changing their name from Dizy-Lizy to Pierrot and several member changes, the final lineup was completed in 1995 with Kirito on vocals, Jun and Aiji on guitar, Kohta on bass and Takeo on drums. After roughly ten years together, Pierrot disbanded in 2006. Their final single was named "Hello", an apt title for a band who started their major career with an album called Finale. 

Vocalist Kirito embarked on a solo career in 2005, before reuniting with Kohta and Takeo to start a new band called Angelo. Aiji officially joined maya, formerly of Ishihara Gundan and Sinners, in LM.C in 2006. Jun joined guitarist Koji (ex-La'cryma Christi) and vocalist Shouta (ex-NIOI) in creating a new band called ALvino sometime in 2006. Pierrot reunited for two shows in 2014, and another two in 2017.

History
In 1994, guitarists Kirito (then going by his real name, Shinya) and Jun formed a rock band named Dizy-Lizy in Nagano. They recruited Hidelow on vocals, Kirito's younger brother Kohta on bass, and Luka on drums. After changing their name to Pierrot, Luka left in November and Takeo joined. Their debut album, Mad Piero, was released in December, having already been recorded with Luka. Then in February 1995, Hidelow also left the band while Aiji joined, completing the final line up of Kirito on vocals, Jun and Aiji on guitar, Kohta on bass and Takeo on drums. After releasing their second album Pandora's Box in July, they signed with Sweet Child Management. This album was named one of the top albums from 1989-1998 in a 2004 issue of the music magazine Band Yarouze.

In 1998 they signed to Toshiba-EMI and released their major debut, the single "Clear Sky", which surprisingly reached number 6 on the Oricon music chart. The album Finale was released in July of the following year, and in April they sold out the Nippon Budokan, which was unheard of for a band just making their debut.

Pierrot left Toshiba-EMI and signed with Universal in 2001. In December 2003, they released their best-selling album Dictators Circus: Magical Melody. Following the release of two compilation albums in 2005, Dictators Circus: A Variant Bud and Dictators Circus: A Deformed Bud, Pierrot announced they were disbanding. They officially disbanded on April 12, 2006, their last release was a single in June 2006, titled "Hello".

Pierrot's song "Kumo no Ito" was covered by Hana Shounen Baddies on the compilation Crush! 2 -90's V-Rock Best Hit Cover Songs-, which was released on November 23, 2011 and features current visual kei bands covering songs from bands that were important to the '90s visual kei movement. "Haruka..." was covered by -OZ- for the similar album Counteraction - V-Rock covered Visual Anime songs Compilation-, which was released on May 23, 2012 and features covers of songs by visual kei bands that were used in anime.

Pierrot announced on April 12, 2014, exactly 8 years since their disbandment, that they would reunite for two shows. The concerts were held at the Saitama Super Arena on October 24 and 25. In 2017, Pierrot reunited again to play a two-day performance with Dir en grey called Androgynos on July 7 and 8 at Yokohama Arena.

Members

Role: vocals/leader (originally guitar)
Real Name: Shinya Murata
Birthday: February 24, 1972
Birthplace: Sapporo, Hokkaido
Now part of the band Angelo together with Kohta and Takeo, and has his own solo career.

Role: guitar
Real name: Shinji Mizui
Birthday: November 17, 1974
Birthplace: Nagano, Japan
Now part of the band LM.C with Maya (formerly Miyavi's support guitarist).

Role: guitar/synth guitar
Real name: Junichi Yamaura
Birthday: May 4, 1973
Birthplace: Nagano, Japan
Now part of the band ALvino with Koji (ex-La'cryma Christi) and Shouta.

Kohta
Role: bass/chorus
Real name: Kohta Murata
Birthday: June 3, 1975
Birthplace: Sapporo, Hokkaido
Now part of the band Angelo together with Kirito and Takeo.

Takeo
Role: drums/percussion
Real name: Takeo Ishikawa
Birthday: July 11,1972
Birthplace: Koriyama, Fukushima
Now part of the band Angelo together with Kirito and Kohta.

Former members
Hidelow – vocals
Luka – drums
Went on to join D≒sire and later Jils, as Hide Hommure -Hideyoshi-.

Discography

Demos
Famme (1994)
Homme (1994)
Piero (July, 1995)

Albums

Celluloid (September 3, 1997) Oricon Albums Chart Peak Position: 63
Finale (July 7, 1999) 5
Private Enemy (November 22, 2000) 14
Heaven: The Customized Landscape (May 24, 2002) 7
ID Attack (July 23, 2003) 6
 16
Freeze (December 1, 2004) 12
Dictators Circus: A Variant Bud (April 6, 2005, singles compilation) 6
Dictators Circus: A Deformed Bud (June 8, 2005, singles' B-side compilation) 15

Singles
"Haken Kreuz" (October 20, 1996)
"Screen" (April 22, 1998) Oricon Singles Chart Peak Position: 36
 6
 5
 10
1st ending theme to the Kamikaze Kaito Jeanne anime
 5
"Creatures" (December  22, 1999) 7
"Agitator" (June 7, 2000) 5
 10
"Paradox" (May 6, 2001)
"Dramatic Neo Anniversary" (August 29, 2001) 5
"Cocoon" (November 21, 2001) 10
 5
Psychedelic Lover" (August 28, 2002) 7
 9
 4
"A Rose-Colored World" was the 2nd opening theme to the Getbackers anime
 16
"Smiley Skeleton" (June 30, 2004) 8
"Mycloud" (October 20, 2004) 7
"Hello" (June 21, 2006) 8

VHS/DVD
Prototype (December 20, 1998)
"Film" Rising a Mad Sky at Nippon Budokan (September 8, 1999)
Tour 1999 Foreteller's Mutation Final: The Genome Control (March 15, 2000)
Dictators Circus V Vol. 1 (December 20, 2000)
Dictators Circus V Vol. 2 (December 20, 2000)
Prototype II (December 20, 2000)
Prototype III (December 19, 2001) 47 
Prototype I+II (December 19, 2001)
Tour Raradoxical Genesis "Anniversary" 2001.9.23 Yokohama Arena (DVD) (April 23, 2003)
Dictators Circus VI at Saitama Super Arena (April 23, 2003) 86
Attack [to] the Freedom (2004, fanclub only)
Dictators Circus VII: A Variant Bud/A Deformed Bud: [Saitama Super Arena] (2005, fanclub only)
Prototype IV (December 14, 2005) 46
Dictators Circus Final 2014. 10. 24 - I Said 「Hello」 - Saitama Super Arena (November 25, 2014)
Dictators Circus Final 2014. 10. 25 - Birthday - Saitama Super Arena (November 25, 2014)
Androgynos (PIERROT X DIR EN GREY) - a view of the Megiddo - / - a view of the Acro - (2 disk set) (December 12, 2017)

References

External links
Official website
LM.C
ALvino

Visual kei musical groups
Japanese alternative rock groups
Japanese hard rock musical groups
Musical groups established in 1994
Musical groups disestablished in 2006
Musical groups from Nagano Prefecture
Japanese gothic rock groups